The 1856 United States presidential election in Illinois took place on November 4, 1856, as part of the 1856 United States presidential election. Voters chose 11 representatives, or electors to the Electoral College, who voted for president and vice president.

Illinois voted for the Democratic candidate, James Buchanan, over Republican candidate John C. Frémont and American Party candidate Millard Fillmore. Buchanan won Illinois by a narrow margin of 3.86%.

This would be the final time a Democratic presidential candidate would win Illinois until Grover Cleveland won it in 1892.

Results

See also
 United States presidential elections in Illinois

References

Illinois
1856
1856 Illinois elections